This is a list of animated direct-to-video series, that is, animated series released direct-to-video.

List

See also
 List of animated internet series
 Lists of animated television series

Direct-to-video
Home video